Pseudonoorda nigropunctalis is a moth in the family Crambidae. It was described by George Hampson in 1899. It is found in Malaysia.

The wingspan is about 18 mm. The forewings are yellowish white with a reddish-brown costa. The terminal area is purplish fuscous. The apical area of the hindwings is purple fuscous with a waved black line on the inner edge.

References

Moths described in 1899
Odontiinae